The 2020–21 Omaha Mavericks men's basketball team represented the University of Nebraska Omaha in the 2020–21 NCAA Division I men's basketball season. The Mavericks, led by 16th-year head coach Derrin Hansen, played their home games at Baxter Arena in Omaha, Nebraska, as members of the Summit League.

Previous season
The Mavericks finished the 2019–20 season 16–16, 9–7 in Summit League play to finish in a tie for fourth place. They lost in the quarterfinals of the Summit League tournament to Oral Roberts.

Roster

Schedule and results

|-
!colspan=12 style=| Non-conference regular season

|-
!colspan=9 style=| Summit League regular season

|-
!colspan=12 style=| Summit League tournament
|-

|-

Source

References

Omaha Mavericks men's basketball seasons
Omaha Mavericks
Omaha Mavericks men's basketball
Omaha Mavericks men's basketball